Urville is a commune in the Calvados department and Normandy region of north-western France.

Iron mining was an important industry in the village until 1989. The village was at the head of a mineral railway linking the iron mines to the SMN steel mills.

Population

See also
Communes of the Calvados department

References

Communes of Calvados (department)
Calvados communes articles needing translation from French Wikipedia